Tommy Steele in Search of Charlie Chaplin is a 1971 British TV special starring Tommy Steele about the origins of Charlie Chaplin.

References

External links
Tommy Steele in Search of Charlie Chaplin at IMDb

1971 in British television